Events from the year 1673 in art.

Events
Engraver Michael Vandergucht joins the Guild of St Luke at Antwerp.

Paintings

 John Greenhill – Portrait of Seth Ward (bishop of Salisbury)
 Charles Le Brun – Alexander and Porus
 Jan van Huchtenburg - Battle of Chocim

Births
January 28 - Georg Gsell, Swiss painter (died 1740)
April - Maria Moninckx, Dutch botanical artist and painter (died 1757)
April 28 - Claude Gillot, French painter, engraver, book illustrator, metal worker, and theatrical designer (died 1722)
June 11 – Bernard Picart, French engraver (died 1733)
date unknown
Thomas Germain, silversmith (died 1748)
Ádám Mányoki, Hungarian painter (died 1757)
Giovanni Battista Lama, Italian painter, active mainly in Naples (died 1748)
Giuseppe Melani, Italian painter, active mainly in Pisa (died 1747)
Pietro Paltronieri, Italian painter of quadratura (died 1741)
probable – Andrea dell'Asta, Italian painter (died 1721)

Deaths
March - Isaack Luttichuys, Dutch Golden Age portrait painter (born 1616)
March 15 – Salvator Rosa, Italian Baroque painter, poet and printmaker (born 1615)
September 6 – Jan Thomas van Ieperen, Flemish painter and engraver (born 1617)
October – Barent Fabritius, Dutch painter (born 1624)
November 27 – Anthonie Palamedesz., Dutch painter (born 1602)
date unknown
Carlo Cornara, Italian painter born in Milan (born 1605)
Anthonie de Lorme, Dutch painter (born 1610)
Francesco Grue, Italian potter and painter (born 1618)
Ingen, Chinese Linji Chán Buddhist monk, poet, and calligrapher (born 1592)
Jochim Neiman, German-born traveling painter who primarily worked in Finland (born 1600)
Mario Nuzzi, Italian painter specializing in still life painting of flower arrangements (born 1603)
Giovanni Quagliata, Italian painter of frescos and large canvases depicting historical and religious subjects (born 1603)
Xiao Yuncong, Chinese landscape painter, calligrapher, and poet in the late Ming Dynasty (born 1596)

 
Years of the 17th century in art
1670s in art